Blas de Otero (15 March 191629 June 1979) was a Spanish poet, associated with the Social poetry movement of the 1950s and 60s in Spain.

References

External links

Fundación Blas de Otero

1916 births
1979 deaths
Spanish male poets
20th-century Spanish poets
Basque writers
People from Bilbao